Paul Spyros Sarbanes (February 3, 1933 – December 6, 2020) was an American politician and attorney. A member of the Democratic Party from Maryland, he served as a member of the United States House of Representatives from 1971 to 1977 and as a United States Senator from 1977 to 2007. Sarbanes was the longest-serving senator in Maryland history until he was surpassed by Barbara Mikulski by a single day when her term ended on January 3, 2017. He was the first Greek American senator.

Born in Salisbury, Maryland, Sarbanes was a graduate of Princeton University, Balliol College, Oxford, and Harvard Law School. Elected to the Maryland House of Delegates in 1966, he went on to serve two terms in the Maryland House from 1967 to 1971. In 1970, he won a seat in the United States House of Representatives, representing Maryland's 4th and later Maryland's 3rd congressional district from 1971 to 1977.

In 1976, he ran for the United States Senate, defeating Republican incumbent John Glenn Beall Jr. with 59% of the vote. Sarbanes was re-elected four times, each time receiving no less than 59% of the vote. He did not seek re-election in 2006, when he was succeeded by fellow Democrat Ben Cardin. Sarbanes was known for his low-key style, often shunning the limelight over his thirty-year Senate career. In 2002, Sarbanes co-sponsored the Sarbanes–Oxley Act, which is cited as his most-noted sponsored piece of legislation.

Early life
Sarbanes was born on Maryland's Eastern Shore in the city of Salisbury to Greek immigrant parents, Matina (née Tsigounis) and Spyros P. Sarbanes, who had emigrated from Laconia, Greece and owned a Salisbury restaurant.

A graduate of Wicomico High School in Salisbury, Maryland, Sarbanes attended Princeton University, earning a bachelor's degree in 1954 from the School of Public and International Affairs after completing a senior thesis titled "The Smith Act: A Denial of American Freedoms". At Princeton, Sarbanes was a member of the American Whig–Cliosophic Society. As a senior, he received the Moses Taylor Pyne Honor Prize, Princeton's highest undergraduate honor. He also was awarded a Rhodes Scholarship that brought him to Balliol College of the University of Oxford in Oxford, England. He graduated with a First Class degree in 1957. Sarbanes then returned to the United States and attended Harvard Law School.

After graduating in 1960, he clerked for Federal Judge Morris A. Soper before entering private practice with two Baltimore, Maryland law firms.

Political career

State legislature
In 1966, Sarbanes ran for the Maryland House of Delegates in Baltimore City and won. During his four years as a State delegate in Annapolis, Maryland he served on both the Judiciary and the Ways and Means Committees.

U.S. House of Representatives
Sarbanes was elected to the United States House of Representatives in 1970 from the fourth district of Maryland and was reelected in 1972 and 1974 from the third district. While in the House, Sarbanes served on the Judiciary Committee, the Merchant Marine and Fisheries Committee, and the Select Committee on House Reorganization.

As a member of the Judiciary Committee he participated in the impeachment process against Richard Nixon. On July 26, 1974, he introduced the first articles of impeachment against President Nixon for obstruction of justice.

U.S. Senate
Sarbanes was elected to the United States Senate in 1976 and re-elected in 1982, 1988, 1994, and 2000. In 2002, he was the United States Senate sponsor of the Sarbanes–Oxley Act of 2002, which reformed federal securities laws in the wake of the 2002 accounting scandals.

Sarbanes served on the following Senate committees:
 Ranking Member, Banking, Housing and Urban Affairs
 Ranking Member, Special Whitewater
 Senior Member, Foreign Relations
 Senior Member, Budget
 Senior Member, Joint Economic

By 1981, Sarbanes was noted as a frequent critic of military budgets. In spite of this, in May of that year, he voted in favor of approving a Reagan administration-backed $136.5 billion military authorization bill. In December, he voted in favor of an amendment to President Ronald Reagan's MX missiles proposal that would divert the silo system by $334 million as well as earmark further research for other methods that would allow giant missiles to be based. While the military authorization bill was seen as supporting the administration, the December vote was viewed as a rebuff of Reagan.

On March 11, 2005, Sarbanes, the longest-serving senator in Maryland history, announced at a news conference his decision not to seek re-election in 2006. Colleagues of Sarbanes said that the reason for his retirement from the Senate was due to his annoyance with not having any leadership roles on committees.

Sarbanes received the Foreign Language Advocacy Award in 2007 from the Northeast Conference on the Teaching of Foreign Languages in recognition of his lifelong commitment to the values, languages, and cultures of the ancient world in service to the modern world.

Personal life and death
In June 1960, Sarbanes married Christine Dunbar of Brighton, England; they had three children (John Sarbanes, Michael Anthony Sarbanes, and Janet Matina Sarbanes) and seven grandchildren. Christine Sarbanes died of cancer on March 22, 2009. Sarbanes held the highest lay office in the Greek Orthodox Church, "Order of St. Andrew, Archon of the Ecumenical Patriarchate" and was a member of the Greek Orthodox Cathedral of the Annunciation in Baltimore.

His son, John Sarbanes, won the general election for Maryland's 3rd congressional district in 2006, the district that Paul Sarbanes represented prior to his election as senator.

Paul Sarbanes died at his home in Baltimore on December 6, 2020, at the age of 87.

In April 2021, Wicomico Public Libraries announced that the library in downtown Salisbury would be renamed after Sarbanes.

Election history
 Sources:

Publications
"The premise of the U. S. Constitutional system", Perspectives on culture and society, vol. 1 (1988), 119–126

Notes

References

External links

|-

|-

|-

|-

|-

|-

|-

1933 births
2020 deaths
21st-century American politicians
Democratic Party members of the Maryland House of Delegates
American Rhodes Scholars
American people of Greek descent
Eastern Orthodox Christians from Maryland
Greek Orthodox Christians from the United States
Princeton University alumni
Princeton Tigers men's basketball players
Harvard Law School alumni
People from Salisbury, Maryland
Politicians from Baltimore
Democratic Party United States senators from Maryland
Recipients of the Order of the Phoenix (Greece)
Democratic Party members of the United States House of Representatives from Maryland
Lawyers from Baltimore
Whitewater controversy
American men's basketball players